The paramesenteric gutters (paramesenteric recesses or infracolic spaces) are two peritoneal recesses – spaces in the abdominal cavity between the colon and the root of the mesentery. There are two paramesenteric gutters; the left paramesenteric gutter and the right paramesenteric gutter.

They are also sometimes, but incorrectly referred to as other paracolic gutters. Paracolic gutters are recesses between the abdominal wall and the colon.

These gutters are clinically important because they allow a passage for infectious fluids from different compartments of the abdomen.

The right paramesenteric gutter
This space is defined by:
 The ascending colon and caecum laterally (further right).
 The transverse colon superiorly.
 The root of the mesentery medially.

The left paramesenteric gutter
This space communicates with the pelvic cavity and is defined by:
 The root of the mesentery medially.
 The descending colon laterally (further left).

See also
 Peritoneal recesses
 Paracolic gutters

References

External links
  - "Abdominal Cavity: Peritoneal Gutters"

Abdomen